Shamim Hossain Patwari (born 2 September 2000) is a Bangladeshi cricketer. He made his international debut for the Bangladesh cricket team in July 2021 against Zimbabwe.

Career

Domestic cricket
Shamim made his first-class debut for Chittagong Division in the 2017–18 National Cricket League on 15 September 2017. He made his Twenty20 debut for Bangladesh Krira Shikkha Protishtan in the 2018–19 Dhaka Premier Division Twenty20 Cricket League on 25 February 2019. He made his List A debut for Bangladesh Krira Shikkha Protishtan in the 2018–19 Dhaka Premier Division Cricket League on 8 March 2019.

International cricket
In December 2019, Shamim was named in Bangladesh's squad for the 2020 Under-19 Cricket World Cup. In February 2021, he was selected in the Bangladesh Emerging squad for their home series against the Ireland Wolves. 

In June 2021, he was named in Bangladesh's Twenty20 International (T20I) squad for their series against Zimbabwe. In the second T20I match, he made his debut against Zimbabwe and scored 29 off 13 balls. In the third T20I match he scored an unbeaten 31 runs off 15 balls, helping Bangladesh to chase down the target of 193 and winn the series by 2–1 margin.

In September 2021, he was named in Bangladesh's squad for the 2021 ICC Men's T20 World Cup.

In March 2023, he was added to Bangladesh One Day International (ODI) squad for their series against England.

References

External links
 

2000 births
Living people
Bangladeshi cricketers
Bangladesh Twenty20 International cricketers
Bangladesh Krira Shikkha Protishtan cricketers
Chittagong Division cricketers
People from Chandpur District